This list of feminists catalogues individuals who identify or have been identified as proponents of feminist political, economic, social, and personal principles for gender equality.

Early feminists

Born before 1499.

16th-century feminists

Born between 1500 and 1599.

17th-century feminists

Born between 1600 and 1699.

18th-century feminists

Born between 1700 and 1799.

Early and mid 19th-century feminists

Born between 1800 and 1874.

Late 19th-century and early 20th-century feminists

Born between 1875 and 1939.

Mid to late 20th-century feminists

Born between 1940 and 1999.

Notable 20th and 21st-century feminists

Birth year is currently unavailable.

See also

 First-wave feminists
 Second-wave feminists
 Third-wave feminists
 Fourth-wave feminists
 Ecofeminism
 Feminist separatism
 French feminism
 Islamic feminists
 Lesbian feminism
 Radical feminism
 Sex-positive feminism
 Suffragettes
 Women's suffrage
 Anti-pornography feminism
 Anti-prostitution feminism
 The Furies Collective
 New York Radical Feminists
 New York Radical Women
 Redstockings
 Riot grrrl
 List of conservative feminisms
 List of suffragists and suffragettes
 List of women's rights activists
 Timeline of first women's suffrage in majority-Muslim countries
 Timeline of women's rights (other than voting)
 Timeline of women's suffrage

References

External links
 National Women's History Project
 FemBio – Notable Women International

Lists of social activists
Feminism-related lists